C. W. Ceram (20 January 1915 – 12 April 1972) was the pseudonym of German journalist, editor at Rowohlt Verlag, and author Kurt Wilhelm Marek, known for his popular works about archaeology.  He chose to write using a pseudonym — spelling his own name backward as an ananym, and latinizing the K as C — to avoid association with his earlier work as a propagandist for the Third Reich.

Ceram was born in Berlin. During World War II, he was a member of the Propagandatruppe. His works from that period include Wir hielten Narvik, 1941, and Rote Spiegel - überall am Feind. Von den Kanonieren des Reichsmarschalls, 1943.

In 1949, Ceram wrote his most famous book, Götter, Gräber und Gelehrte — published in English as Gods, Graves and Scholars: The Story of Archaeology — an account of the historical development of archaeology.  Published in 28 languages, Ceram's book eventually received a printing of more than 5 million copies, and is still in print. His very first article of this type was about epigraphy entitled: On the Decipherment of an Unknown Script and was published in the Berliner Illustrierte (1935).

Other books by the author include The Secret of the Hittites (1956), March of Archaeology (1958) and The First American (1971), a book on ancient North American history. Using his actual name he published Yestermorrow: Notes on Man's Progress (1961); Hands on the Past: The Pioneer Archaeologists Tell Their Own Story  (1966).

Kurt Marek was responsible for the publication of A Woman in Berlin, the anonymous memoir of a German woman raped by Red Army troops.

He died at Hamburg in 1972.

The Ceram Prize in archaeology is named after him.

References

1915 births
1972 deaths
Writers from Berlin
German male journalists
German journalists
20th-century German journalists
German male writers
Burials at the Ohlsdorf Cemetery